The École normale supérieure de Lyon (also known as ENS de Lyon, ENSL  or Normale Sup' Lyon) is a French grande école located in the city of Lyon. It is one of the four prestigious écoles normales supérieures in France. The school is composed of two academic units— Arts and Sciences— with campuses in Lyon, near the confluence of the Rhône and Saône rivers.

ENSL's students usually enjoy a special civil servant status in the wake of highly competitive exams, providing they pursue careers in public service. Although it maintains extensive connections with the University of Lyon and external research institutions, including the CNRS, the school remains independent.

History

Training teachers for normal schools

L'École normale supérieure de Lyon is the descendant of two top educational institutions founded by Jules Ferry:
L'École normale supérieure de Fontenay-aux-Roses, for girls, founded in 1880.
L'École normale supérieure de Saint-Cloud, for boys, founded in 1882.
Recruiting among the most brilliant French students, these two schools used to train the future professors of the French normal schools. Whereas these schools were largely regarded as meritocratic, their sisters - the eldest, l'École Normale Supérieure de la Rue d'Ulm, and her feminine counterpart, l'École normale supérieure de jeunes filles de Sèvres -, which trained academics, were de facto dedicated to the heirs of the Parisian elites.

A shift towards secondary and higher education

Following the decline of normal schools and a reform of national education, the decree of February 19, 1945 granted both institutions the title of Écoles normales préparatoires à l'enseignement secondaire. The Schools' purpose changed in the context of a secondary system democratisation.  By 1956, the length of studies was increased to four years in order to institute a preparation for the agrégation - a prestigious teaching qualification. Increasingly opening up to research, they aligned their development strategies with those of the ENS Ulm and Sèvres.

The relocation in Lyon

As part of France's process of decentralisation, the Schools' scientific departments moved in 1987 to Gerland, a former Lyon's industrial district, in the premises of the current Monod campus. The relocated institution was named ENS Lyon.
Humanities students remained in the Paris region within the coeducational École normale supérieure de Fontenay-Saint-Cloud. In 2000, this school, informally renamed École normale supérieure lettres et sciences humaines, was transferred to the new Descartes Campus also located in Gerland.

On the first of January 2010, the two branches merged to become a single institution, retaining the name École normale supérieure de Lyon.

Academics 
ENS de Lyon is a Grande École, a French institution of higher education that is separate from, but parallel and connected to the main framework of the French public university system. Similar to the Ivy League in the United States, Oxbridge in the UK, and C9 League in China, Grandes Écoles are elite academic institutions that admit students through an extremely competitive process. Grandes Écoles typically they have much smaller class sizes and student bodies than public universities in France, and many of their programs are taught in English. While most Grandes Écoles are more expensive than French universities, ENS de Lyon charges the same tuition fees: €243 annually for the master's degree in 2021–2022; €184 for the Bachelor's. International internships, study abroad opportunities, and close ties with government and the corporate world are a hallmark of the Grandes Écoles. Degrees from École normale supérieure are accredited by the Conférence des Grandes Écoles and awarded by the Ministry of National Education (France). Alums go on to occupy elite positions within government, administration, and corporate firms in France.

Teaching at the ENS de Lyon is organised through twelve main departments, spread over the two campuses:

Monod Campus: Natural and Experimental Sciences Departments

Biology
Chemistry
Computer Science
Earth Science
Mathematics
Physics

Descartes Campus: Arts, Humanities and Social Sciences Departments

Arts: Musicology, Cinema and Theater studies, Classics and modern French Literature
Economics
Education and digital humanities
Foreign Languages, Literatures and Civilizations: Arabic, Chinese, English, German, Italian, Spanish and Russian
Human Sciences: Philosophy, Cognitive science and Anthropology
Social Sciences: Sociology, History, Geography, Political science and International studies

Research
23 of ENSL's research groups have contractual ties to major research organizations, notably the CNRS and INSERM.  ENSL is a member of several advanced research networks and competitive clusters, including Lyon BioPôle, and hosts an Institute for Advanced Study, the Collegium de Lyon.

Sciences
Institute of Functional Genomics of Lyon (IGFL)
Laboratory of molecular and cell biology (LBMC)
Laboratory of plant reproduction and development (RDP)
Laboratory of human virology (VIRO)
Laboratory of Earth Sciences (LST)
Joliot-Curie interdisciplinary laboratory (LJC)
Laboratory of Pure and Applied Mathematics (UMPA)
Laboratory of chemistry
Computer science laboratory (LIP)
Laboratory of physics
Astronomy research center (CRAL)
Center for high field Nuclear Magnetic Resonance (CRMN)

Humanities
C2SO - Communication, culture and society
Institute for the History of Classical Thought, from Humanism to the Enlightenment
Institute of East Asian Studies (IAO) 
Interactions, Corpuses, Learning and Representations
Interdisciplinary approach to the logics of power in medieval Iberian societies
Literature, Ideologies and Représentations in the Eighteenth and Nineteenth Centuries
Rhône-Alpes Centre for Historical Research
Socialisation Research Group
Triangle: Action, Discourses, Economic and Political Thought
History and Archaeology of the Medieval Christian and Islamic Worlds
Economic Theory and Analysis Group

Students

Normaliens-élèves

ENSL retains its close links to the classes préparatoires which prepare high-level students - previously selected on the basis of their academic record - for the competitive entrance examination that is taken after two years of pluridisciplinary undergraduate-level study.

Students who succeed in the entrance examinations, which attract some 6000 candidates for 228 positions, are known as normaliens-élèves; those who are from France or another European Union country are considered trainee public servants, and receive a salary for their studies during 4 years. A second entrance examination is also open to students who have not gone through the classes préparatoires system.

In return of their salary, they have to serve in public services for 10 years.

Normaliens-étudiants

Entry to ENSL is not restricted to normaliens-élèves. Students may also apply through a separate admissions process based on academic prowess. The normaliens-étudiants are not public servants, but their formation and diploma are the same as those of the normaliens-élèves.

Auditeurs de masters

An auditeur de master is someone who has been admitted at the ENSL at the master level. By opposition to the normaliens-élèves and the normaliens-étudiants, they don't have the title of Normalien and are just eligible to a master's degree. They can't obtain the ENSL diploma.

Studies

First year
Students prepare the third year of Licence, the equivalent of a UK Bachelor's degree.
The ENS de Lyon offers numerous courses which are conceived as preparations for Masters.

Second and third years
Students prepare in two years their Master's degree. 5 research Masters are proposed in Sciences, 36 in Humanities.

Fourth year
During this year, students can prepare the agrégation teacher recruitment examination in 16 different subjects.
Students can also start their PhD, go studying for one year or more in a foreign country, or follow during one year courses in other subjects.

Gap years

Between the first and fourth year, normaliens can also spend up to 2 free years called années sans solde, during which they can study other disciplines or do a long internship, sometimes in foreign countries. Each année sans solde project needs the approval of the ENSL supervisors.

Doctoral studies
The ENS de Lyon welcomes over 400 PhD students from all over the world. Normaliens can apply to specific doctoral contracts, as long as the thesis is undertaken within a French research institution.

Rankings

The 2016 QS World University Rankings ranked ENSL 177th university in the world.

However, international rankings do not suit well the French academic system, where research organizations are often independent from universities. Moreover, the ENS are small institutions favouring education quality rather than research productivity. For instance, some French universities are better ranked than the ENS, even though the different écoles normales supérieures are considered to be among the highest French academic institutions due to their endowment, prestige and selectivity.

Notable people

Faculty
 Jean Giraud (1936 – 2007) - mathematician
 Francis Albarède (born 1937) - geochemist
 Jean-Pierre Hansen (born 1942, in Luxembourg) - chemist 
 Jean-Claude Sikorav (born 1957) - mathematician
 Hélène Miard-Delacroix (born 1959) – historian and Germanist
 Emmanuel Giroux (born 1961) - mathematician
 Claire Mathieu (born 1965, in Caen) - computer scientist and mathematician
 Cédric Villani (born 1973, in Brive-la-Gaillarde) - politician and mathematician 
 Laure Saint-Raymond (born 1975) - mathematician
 Sophie Morel (born 1979) - mathematician

Alumni
 Laurent Freidel - theoretical physicist 
 Georges Calas - mineralogist
 Catherine Bréchignac (born 1946, in Paris) - physicist
 Jacques Prost born 1946, in Bourg-en-Bresse) - physicist 
 Étienne Ghys (born 1954) - mathematician 
 Jakob von Weizsäcker (born 1970, in Heidelberg) - German economist and politician 
 Emmanuel Grenier (born 1970, in Château-Thierry) - mathematician
 Mazarine Pingeot (born 1974, in Avignon) - writer, journalist and professor
 Alessio Figalli (born 1984) - Italian mathematician

Recipients of honorary degree
 Yakov Eliashberg (born 1946, in Leningrad) - mathematician
 Paul Seymour (mathematician) (born 1950) - British mathematician
 Ole Petter Ottersen (born 1955, in Kongsberg) - Norwegian physician and neuroscientist

References

External links
 Official website

ENS Fontenay-Saint-Cloud-Lyon alumni
Écoles Normales Supérieures
Universities and colleges in Lyon
7th arrondissement of Lyon
Lyon
Grands établissements
Educational institutions established in 1880
1880 establishments in France